Datuk Chandran Mutveeran, popularly known as M. Chandran (4 May 1942 – 28 September 2019), was a Malaysian footballer.

Playing and coaching career
As a player, he mainly played for Selangor FA, winning trophies for his team and establishing himself as the playmaker.

As a member of Malaysia national team, he competed in the men's tournament at the 1972 Summer Olympics and featured in  all three group matches. 

After retiring, he coached Selangor and Malaysia. On 11 May 1975, M.Chandran led Malaysia Selection against Arsenal FC in a friendly match. Spearheaded by Mokhtar Dahari up front, the selection team embarrassed Arsenal by 2-0 at Merdeka Stadium. 

M. Chandran was awarded with Datuk title by Sultan of Pahang in 2000 (who was coincidentally the President of Football Association of Malaysia (FAM) at that time) for his contributions to Malaysian football.

In 2006, he suffered a stroke but kept active as a coach and was on the FAM technical committee at various points.

On 17 September 2014, FourFourTwo included him on their list of the top 25 Malaysian footballers of all time.

Death
He died at his home in Ampang, Selangor, on 28 September 2019.

Honours

Player
 Bronze medal Asian Games: 1974
 Merdeka Cup: 1968, 1973
 Malaysia Cup: 1962, 1963, 1966, 1968, 1969, 1971, 1972, 1973, 1975
AFC Asian All Stars: 1968
 OCM Hall of Fame: 2004
 IFFHS Men’s All Time Malaysia Dream Team: 2022

Head Coach
 Malaysia Cup: 1975, 1976, 1978, 1986

Orders 
  :
  Member of the Order of the Defender of the Realm (A.M.N.)
  :
  Knight Companion of the Order of the Crown of Pahang (D.I.M.P.) - Dato' 
  :
  Recipient of the Meritorious Service Medal (P.J.K.)

See also
 List of men's footballers with 100 or more international caps

References

External links
 
 Interview with Datuk M. Chandran (in Tamil)

1942 births
2019 deaths
Malaysian footballers
Malaysia international footballers
Olympic footballers of Malaysia
Footballers at the 1972 Summer Olympics
Place of birth missing
Malaysian people of Tamil descent
Malaysian sportspeople of Indian descent
Association football defenders
Competitors at the 1969 Southeast Asian Peninsular Games
Southeast Asian Games bronze medalists for Malaysia
Southeast Asian Games medalists in football
Selangor FA players
FIFA Century Club
People from Perak